Pilisszentlászló is a village in Pest county, Hungary.

It has fewer than 900 inhabitants.

References

Populated places in Pest County